Przesławice may refer to:

Przesławice, Kuyavian-Pomeranian Voivodeship (north-central Poland)
Przesławice, Miechów County, Lesser Poland Voivodeship (south Poland)
Przesławice, Proszowice County, Lesser Poland Voivodeship (south Poland)
Przęsławice, Grójec County, Masovian Voivodeship (east-central Poland)
Przęsławice, Sochaczew County, Masovian Voivodeship (east-central Poland)